Cellular retinoic acid-binding protein 1 is a protein that in humans is encoded by the CRABP1 gene.

CRABP1 is assumed to play an important role in retinoic acid-mediated differentiation and proliferation processes. It is structurally similar to the cellular retinol-binding proteins, but binds only retinoic acid. CRABP1 is constitutively expressed and is believed to have different functions in the cell than the related CRABP2.

Function 

CRABP1 binds to retinoid acid and helps to transport it into the nucleus (Figure 1). Both CRABP1 and CRABP2 perform this activity. The retinoic acid molecule is then released and further bound to retinoic acid receptor (RAR) and the retinoid X receptor (RXR) as homodimers or heterodimers. This complex then further binds to retinoic acid response elements (RARE) on DNA that regulates transcription of retinoid acid dependent null genes. The domains for the nuclear localization and the retinoic acid binding are shown in Figure 3.

CRABP1 has been found to be involved in multiple cancer proliferation pathways. CRABP1 activates the extracellular signal-regulated kinase, ERK1 and ERK2 kinases, which are involved in the cell cycle. CRABP1 activity can thus extend the cell cycle, e.g. in embryonic and neural stem cells. Knockout mice without CRABP1 showed increased neural stem cell proliferation and thus hippocampus neurogenesis. Furthermore, learning and memory were improved in knockout mice, as measured by the Morris water maze test and an object recognition task.

CRABP1 is also involved in cancer cell apoptosis. trans-retinoic acid was considered a [null therapeutic target for cancer]  as a ligand of CRABP1. It was observed that CRABP1 regulated ERK1/2) which in turn activates the protein phosphatase 2A (PP2A) that induces apoptosis of cancer cells and lengthens the cell cycle of embryonic stem cells. PP2A activity promotes the stem cells renewal ability during the differentiation process. When CRABP1 was knocked down the apoptotic induction  ability was also removed and allowed for cell proliferation. The re-expression of CRABP1 in CRABP1 null cells brought back the induced apoptotic activity. Thus CRABP1 may be used as a therapeutic target along with trans-retinoic acid for apoptotic activity within cancer cells. Figure 2 illustrates both pathways of retinoic acid binding to CRABP for cell proliferation and apoptotic activity.

References

Further reading

External links 
 
 

Lipocalins